Our Man in Beirut is the debut book by British-Lebanese author and publisher Nasri Atallah. It is an anthology of essays collected from his widely read blog that ran from 2009 to 2012, that deal with the subject of dual identity, and settling back into your ethnic home culture. Through humor, the book tackles Lebanese society's challenging topics, such as sexuality, racism, post-traumatic stress, superficiality, destruction of heritage. Atallah found his publisher  and got his first book signing at Waterstones in London through posts on his social media accounts.

References

2011 non-fiction books
Lebanese literature